"The Threat Is Real" is a song by American thrash metal band Megadeth, written by Dave Mustaine. It is the opening track from their fifteenth studio album Dystopia, which was released on January 22, 2016. The song was released as the album's second single on streaming services on November 25, 2015, and on vinyl on November 27, 2015.

Music video 
The music video features the band members trapped in a jail cell inside of a dilapidated city. The story shown in the video continues with the album’s titular track’s music video, It was released on December 11th, 2015.

Performances
The song debuted live in Denver, Colorado, on February 23, 2016. It is the second most performed song from the album, being played nearly 230 times as of September 2022. A live performance filmed at Hellfest 2016 was featured on the DVD of the Japanese Deluxe Edition of Dystopia.

Critical reception
The song was ranked the third greatest from the album by Return Of Rock.

Track listing

12-inch vinyl

Personnel 
Credits adapted from Dystopia liner notes.

Megadeth
 Dave Mustaine – lead and rhythm guitars, lead vocals
 Kiko Loureiro – lead guitars, backing vocals
 David Ellefson – bass, backing vocals
 Chris Adler – drums

Additional musicians
Farah Siraj – guest vocals
Chris Rodriguez  – backing vocals

Production and design
Produced by Dave Mustaine and Chris Rakestraw
Engineering by Chris Rakestraw
Mixed by Josh Wilbur
Pre-production by Cameron Webb
Additional production by Jeff Balding
Mastering by Ted Jensen
Brent Elliott White – cover artwork

References

2015 singles
2015 songs
Megadeth songs
Songs written by Dave Mustaine